Birkerød station is the railway station in Birkerød north of Copenhagen, Denmark. It is served by S-trains on the Hillerød radial.
The railway station was built in 1864 and the first S-trains were used in 1968.

When built, the railroad station was situated a bit outside Birkerød. The reason for this was that it had to be situated on a hill to make it easier to get the trains started again after stopping. But today, Birkerød has grown a lot, so it is now located in the centre of the city.

See also
 List of railway stations in Denmark

References

External links

S-train (Copenhagen) stations
Railway stations opened in 1864
Birkerød
Railway stations in Denmark opened in the 19th century